Donald Arthur Rader (born October 21, 1935) is an American jazz trumpeter.

Career
Rader began playing trumpet at age five and was taught by his father. He studied at Sam Houston State Teachers College and served in the Navy in the 1950s as a member of the band, then played and arranged for Woody Herman (1959–61), Maynard Ferguson (1961–63), and Count Basie (1963–64), Louie Bellson, Harry James, Terry Gibbs, Frank Foster, Henry Mancini, Les Brown (1967–72), and Stan Kenton.

He toured with Della Reese, Sarah Vaughn, Andy Williams, Percy Faith, Diana Ross, Elvis Presley, Jerry Lewis (intermittently for 28 years), and Bob Hope (intermittently for 28 years with five tours of wartime Vietnam).

He assembled a quintet in Los Angeles in 1972 and continued working with West Coast jazz musicians, including Lanny Morgan, Lew Tabackin, and Toshiko Akiyoshi. He recorded as a leader and worked in music education for many years, including in Australia in the 1980s.

Discography
 Polluted Tears (DRM, 1973)
 Now (PBR International, 1976)
 Don Rader (Now, 1978)
 Wallflower (Discovery, 1978)
 Anemone (Jet Danger, 1980)
 A Foreign Affair (Bellaphon, 1990)
 Off the Beaten Track (Tall Poppies, 1998)
 Odyssey (2006)

As sideman
With Count Basie
 Ella and Basie! (Verve, 1963)
 More Hits of the 50's and 60's (Verve, 1963)
 It Might as Well Be Swing (Reprise, 1964)

With Maynard Ferguson
 Maynard '62 (Roulette, 1962)
 Si! Si! M.F. (Roulette, 1962)
 Maynard '63 (Roulette, 1962)
 Message from Maynard (Roulette, 1962)
 Maynard '64 (Roulette 1959-62 [1963])
 Color Him Wild (Mainstream, 1965)
 The Blues Roar (Mainstream, 1965)

References

External links
Jazz Professional profile of Don Rader 
Los Angeles Times profile of Don Rader 
Los Angeles Times article about Don Rader

Living people
1935 births
American jazz trumpeters
American male trumpeters
Jazz musicians from Pennsylvania
People from Rochester, Pennsylvania
21st-century trumpeters
21st-century American male musicians
American male jazz musicians